William Paul Willis (born 15 June 1952) is a former English cricketer. Willis was a right-handed batsman who bowled right-arm fast-medium. He was born in Durham, County Durham.

Willis made his debut for Lincolnshire in the 1974 Minor Counties Championship against the Yorkshire Second XI. Willis played Minor counties cricket for Lincolnshire from 1974 to 1979, which included 30 Minor Counties Championship matches. He made his List A debut against Glamorgan in the 1st round of the 1974 Gillette Cup. He played 2 further List A matches for Lincolnshire, against Surrey in the 2nd round of the 1974 tournament and Derbyshire in the 1976 Gillette Cup. In his 3 matches, he scored 31 runs and took a single wicket, which came at an overall cost of 114 runs.

References

External links
Paul Willis at ESPNcricinfo
Paul Willis at CricketArchive

1952 births
Living people
Sportspeople from Durham, England
English cricketers
Lincolnshire cricketers
Cricketers from County Durham